The 2018–19 Northern Illinois Huskies women's basketball team represents Northern Illinois University during the 2018–19 NCAA Division I women's basketball season. The Huskies, led by fourth-year head coach Lisa Carlsen, play their home games at the Convocation Center in DeKalb, Illinois as members of the West Division of the Mid-American Conference. They finished the season 19–13, 10–8 in MAC play to finish in third place in the West division. They advanced to the quarterfinals of the MAC women's tournament where they lost to Ohio. Despite having 19 wins, they were not invited to a postseason tournament.

Roster

Schedule and results

|-
!colspan=9 style=| Exhibition

|-
!colspan=9 style=| Non-conference regular season

|-
!colspan=9 style=| MAC regular season

|-
!colspan=9 style=| MAC Women's Tournament

See also
 2018–19 Northern Illinois Huskies men's basketball team

References

Northern Illinois
Northern Illinois Huskies women's basketball seasons